Benny Blisto is the debut album from the Dutch indie band Go Back to the Zoo.

Track listing

All songs written by Go Back to the Zoo.

Personnel 
Go Back to the Zoo
Cas Hieltjes – vocals and guitars
Teun Hieltjes – guitars and vocals
Bram Kniest – drums and vocals
Lars Kroon – bass guitar

References 

2010 debut albums
Go Back to the Zoo albums